Baby Daddy is an American sitcom created by Dan Berendsen that premiered in 2012.

Baby Daddy may also refer to:

The father of a child, like baby mama
"Baby Daddy", a song by American rapper Hopsin from the 2010 album Raw
"Baby Daddy", a 2017 song by Afro-Puerto Rican rapper Joseline Hernandez
"Baby Daddy", a song by American rapper Lil Yachty from the 2018 album Lil Boat 2

See also
Babydaddy, a musician
My Baby Daddy, a song by B-Rock and the Bizz
Sugar daddy (disambiguation)